Primera División de México (Mexican First Division) Invierno 1999 is a Mexican football tournament - one of two short tournaments that take up the entire year to determine the champion(s) of Mexican football. It began on Saturday, August 14, 1999, and ran until November 21, when the regular season ended. In the final Pachuca defeated Cruz Azul and became champions for the first time.

Overview

Final standings (groups)

League table

Results

Top goalscorers 
Players sorted first by goals scored, then by last name. Only regular season goals listed.

Source: MedioTiempo

Playoffs

Repechage

4–4 on aggregate. Pachuca advanced for being the higher seeded team.

Bracket

Quarterfinals

América won 1–0 on aggregate.

Cruz Azul won 5–3 on aggregate.

Atlas won 5–4 on aggregate.

Pachuca won 3–2 on aggregate.

Semifinals

Cruz Azul won 2–1 on aggregate.

Pachuca won 2–1 on aggregate.

Finals

First leg

Pachuca won 3–2 on aggregate.

Second leg

External links
 Mediotiempo.com (where information was obtained)

Mexico
1999–2000 in Mexican football
1999B